Nicholas III, Lord of Mecklenburg (after 1230 – 8 June 1289 or 1290) was from 1264 to 1289 Lord of Mecklenburg.

He was the son of John I and his wife, Luitgard of Henneberg (1210-1267), the daughter of Count Poppo VII of Henneberg.  On 9 January 1266, he was appointed canon of Lübeck Cathedral.  In 1269 he was also a priest in the St. Mary's Church in Wismar.

When Henry I was taken prisoner during a pilgrimage to the Holy Land, Nicholas III and his brother John II took up the regency for Henry's underage sons.  He is last mentioned as living in a document dated 2 April 1289.

He died on 8 June 1289 or 1290 and was buried in Doberan Minster.

See also 
 List of dukes and grand dukes of Mecklenburg

External links 
 Genealogical table of the House of Mecklenburg

Lords of Mecklenburg
13th-century births
13th-century deaths
13th-century German nobility
Year of birth unknown
Year of death uncertain